Henry Catchpole (fl. 1361–1386) was an English politician.

Family
He was married to a woman named Margaret.

Career
He was a Member (MP) of the Parliament of England for Hereford in 1361, 1366, 1369, 1371, 1378, October 1383 and 1386.

References

Year of birth missing
Year of death missing
English MPs 1361
English MPs 1366
English MPs 1369
English MPs 1371
English MPs 1378
English MPs October 1383
English MPs 1386
14th-century English politicians
People from Hereford